The Netherlands Football League Championship 1949–1950 was contested by 60 teams participating in six divisions. The national champion would be determined by a play-off featuring the winners of the eastern, northern, two southern and two western football divisions of the Netherlands. SV Limburgia won this year's championship by beating Blauw-Wit Amsterdam, Maurits, Ajax, sc Heerenveen and Enschedese Boys.

At the end of this season, the KNVB re-aligned the current system of Regional Divisions into 5 new Divisions for 1950–51, to be called Eerste Klasse A-E.

New entrants
Eerste Klasse South-I:
Moving in from South-II: SC Helmondia, SV Kerkrade, NOAD, PSV Eindhoven and Sittardse Boys
Promoted from 2nd Division: RBC Roosendaal
Eerste Klasse South-II:
Moving in from South-I: BVV Den Bosch, Juliana, NAC, VV TSC and Willem II
Eerste Klasse West-I:
Moving in from West-II: Feijenoord, Hermes DVS, KFC, VSV and Zeeburgia
Eerste Klasse Wëst-II:
Moving in from West-I: AFC Ajax, HVV 't Gooi, SVV, De Volewijckers and Xerxes
Promoted from 2nd Division: RCH

Divisions

Eerste Klasse East

Eerste Klasse North

Eerste Klasse South-I

Eerste Klasse South-II

Eerste Klasse West-I

Eerste Klasse West-II

Championship play-off

References
RSSSF Netherlands Football League Championships 1898-1954
RSSSF Eerste Klasse Oost
RSSSF Eerste Klasse Noord
RSSSF Eerste Klasse Zuid
RSSSF Eerste Klasse West

Netherlands Football League Championship seasons
1949–50 in Dutch football
Neth